This is a list of characters featured in the Mexican telenovela, Atrévete a soñar.

Cast

Peralta Castro family

Rincón Peña family

Las populares

Las divinas

K&B

Supporting characters 
Jaqueline Castro
“Victoria”

Special appearances

Special musical guests 
During the telenovela, different artists participated, interacting with the cast. Here are some of the most notable:

 Paulina Rubio
 María José
 Moderatto
 The Veronicas
 David Bisbal
 Jonas Brothers
 Fanny Lú
 Luis Fonsi
 Fey
 Enrique Iglesias

External links 
 

Lists of Mexican television series characters
Lists of children's television characters